Thomas Scott was formerly the Assistant Surveyor-General of Tasmania. He was responsible for a significant survey of Tasmania in 1824 which led to the production of the most detailed map of the region at the time.

References

Australian surveyors